The Republic of Zamboanga was a short-lived revolutionary government, founded by General Vicente Alvarez with his Zamboangueño Revolutionary Forces after the Spanish government in Zamboanga, Philippines officially surrendered and turned over Real Fuerza de Nuestra Señora La Virgen del Pilar de Zaragoza to Gen. Vicente Álvarez in May 1899. On May 28, 1899, Gen. Vicente Álvarez proclaimed independence and became the first and last genuinely elected president of the republic.

History

Establishment
On February 28, 1899, in a house in Santa Maria, a revolutionary government was organized and General Vicente Alvarez was elected provisional president and commander-in-chief. He then planned to take Fort Pilar which was the last Spanish stronghold in the Philippines.

End of Spanish rule
The republic was formally established on May 18, 1899, with the surrender of Fort Pilar to the Revolutionary Government of Zamboanga under the leadership of General Alvarez. On May 23, 1899, the Spaniards finally evacuated Zamboanga, after burning down most of the city's buildings in contempt of the Zamboangueños' revolt against them.

American occupation
General Álvarez's term was cut short when the commander of Tetuan, Isidro Midel, cooperated with the Americans in exchange for the presidency with his cohort Datu Mandi. He then ordered the assassination of Major Melanio Calixto, acting commander of Zamboanga, because Álvarez was on a trip to Basilan to recruit more forces. On November 16, 1899, Midel flew the white flag over Fort Pilar to signal the occupying American forces to enter the fort which led to the overthrow of Álvarez's government. Álvarez and his allies were forced to flee to the nearby town of Mercedes then to the island of Basilan and went into hiding. In December 1899, Captain Pratt of the 23rd U.S. Infantry arrived at Zamboanga and took control of Fort Pilar. Thereafter, the nascent republic became a U.S. protectorate or puppet government and Midel as puppet leader of U.S. was allowed to continue as president of the republic for about sixteen months.

Decline and aftermath of the Republic
In March 1901, the Americans allowed the republic to hold elections and Mariano Arquiza was elected to succeed Midel as the new president of the Zamboanga Republic. However, Arquiza's government did not exercise effective authority over Zamboanga and finally in March 1903, the Republic of Zamboanga was dissolved. After, the American colonial government designated Zamboanga as capital of the newly established Moro Province which served as the provincial entity of Mindanao with Brigadier General Leonard Wood as its governor.

Legacy
The Republic of Zamboanga during President Álvarez's term claimed territorial rights over the islands of Mindanao, Basilan, and Sulu, encompassing all of the southern Philippines in the midst of war against the Spanish, Americans, and natives of those islands. However, the Republic's actual sovereignty extended only to the current boundaries of Zamboanga City.

See also
 Zamboanga City
 List of historical unrecognized countries
 "The Monkeys Have No Tails in Zamboanga"

Notes

External links
 Vicente Alvarez and the Battle for Fort Pilar from the National Historical Commission of the Philippines
 Watawat.net: The Republic of Zamboanga 

Republic of Zamboanga
Republic of Zamboanga
Republic of Zamboanga
Former republics
Former countries in Southeast Asia
States and territories established in 1899
States and territories disestablished in 1903
Republic of Zamboanga
Republic of Zamboanga